Stephen Alan "Steve" Tutill (born 1 October 1969) is an English former professional footballer who played as a defender.

Career
Born in York, Tutill joined the York City youth system on associate schoolboy forms and having been capped eight times by England schools in 1985 and 1986 he entered York's Youth Training Scheme in 1986. He made his first team debut for York as a substitute in a 1–1 draw with Rochdale in the Associate Members' Cup on 6 January 1987. He suffered a broken ankle at Bristol City in December, but having impressed manager Bobby Saxton he signed a professional contract with York in January 1988. He was named the club's Clubman of the Year for the 1990–91 season, which he completed with 47 appearances for York. He played in both legs of York's 4–3 aggregate victory over Manchester United in the League Cup second round in the 1995–96 season.

Tutill joined Darlington on a one-month loan in February 1998 and he made his debut against Mansfield Town on 21 February. He took over as captain during this period and on 19 March he agreed to sign for the club permanently on a free transfer. He signed for Chesterfield on a three-year contract in July 2000 after talks over a new deal with Darlington broke down.

An Achilles tendon injury sustained in December forced Tutill to retire from football in May 2002 and he moved on to work in the prison service.

References

External links

1969 births
Living people
Footballers from York
English footballers
England schools international footballers
Association football defenders
York City F.C. players
Darlington F.C. players
Chesterfield F.C. players
English Football League players